Wilfrid Montilas is a current football manager and former Haitian international footballer.

In October 2016, he won the 2017 Under 20 Caribbean Cup with Haiti U-20, qualifying for the 2017 CONCACAF U-20 Championship.

References

1971 births
Living people
Association football midfielders
Haitian footballers
Don Bosco FC players
Ligue Haïtienne players
Haiti international footballers